Garlands is the debut album by the Scottish alternative rock band Cocteau Twins. It was released on 10July1982 by the record label 4AD. It peaked in the top 5 of the UK Independent Albums Chart, and received support from BBC Radio 1 radio host John Peel.

Background
Garlands is the only album the band recorded with original bassist Will Heggie. Prior to the album the band recorded a four-track session for John Peel in June 1982 including "Wax and Wane" and "Garlands". A second John Peel session in January 1983 was included as bonus tracks on the cassette and CD release of Garlands. Cindy Sharp of Cindytalk provided backing vocals on "Dear Heart", "Hearsay Please" and "Hazel".

Martin C. Strong noted that the album was "hastily recorded" but also featured an "interesting fusion of monochromatic rhythms, textured guitar distortion, and early sampling technology." The album's sound was described in The Rough Guide to Rock as "a blend of ominous pulsating bass, stark TR808 drums, cyclical guitar and great screeching arcs of reverberating feedback, over which Liz alternated dry, brittle utterings with full-power vocal gymnastics". Billboard described the album as "dark post-punk".  The Arts Desk noted that “though they had their own voice, the debut’s debt to Siouxsie and the Banshees was apparent".

Sleeve
The photograph on the front cover was conceived by Nigel Grierson when he was at college. It was part of a project on his Graphic Design course for alternative images for Siouxsie and the Banshees' debut album The Scream. The picture was later chosen by Cocteau Twins and Ivo.

Release 
Garlands was released as a vinyl LP by 4AD on 10 July 1982 with artwork by 23 Envelope. Lyrics from "But I’m Not", "Shallow then Halo", "Garlands" and "Grail Overfloweth" were printed on the inner sleeve.

The original British cassette release included four additional tracks from a John Peel radio session. The original British, Brazilian and Canadian cassette and CD releases featured the album, the Peel session, and two other tracks that were recorded for an unreleased single, which was to have been the band's first release. The four Peel Session recordings were later released as BBC Sessions in 1999.

A remastered version of "Blind Dumb Deaf" was included on the 2000 compilation Stars and Topsoil, a version of "Hazel" appeared on the band's Peppermint Pig EP, released in 1983, and a remixed version of "Wax and Wane" was included on the 1985 compilation The Pink Opaque.

Garlands was remastered and re-released by 4AD in 2003. The first pressing incorrectly labelled the track "Blood Bitch" as "Blood Bath", but this was subsequently corrected.

Garlands was re-released on vinyl as part of a box set in 2010 and as an LP with the original sleeve artwork in 2020.

Reception and legacy

Though it was their first record, by 2 August 1982 the album had reached number 14 on the UK Indie Albums chart. Sounds critic Helen Fitzgerald called the album "bloody good. A fluid frieze of wispy images made all the more haunting by Elizabeth's distilled vocal maturity, fluctuating from a brittle fragility to a voluble dexterity with full range and power".

However, Cocteau Twins' roadie Collin Wallace recalled that "Garlands was written off in the UK as another Siouxsie copy band, and Elisabeth [Fraser] was a huge Siouxsie fan." Spin wrote that the album "[sounds] like Siouxsie and the Banshees with echo and smeared mascara". In its review of the album, AllMusic was generally critical, writing that "Garlands falters due to something the band generally avoided in the future – overt repetition. [...] As a debut effort, though, Garlands makes its own curious mark, preparing the band for greater heights".

In a positive 2020 review, Dom Gourley of Under the Radar stated that the album "represented a year zero for alternative guitar music," adding that "songs like 'Wax and Wane' and 'But I’m Not' undoubtedly influenced a generation of effects pedalled guitar slingers decades on." In 2021, Mark Clifford of Seefeel praised the album's production and use of drum machine backing: "I don’t think they get credited enough for that. Garlands, it’s basically electronic beats with noise on top."

Track listing

Personnel 
Cocteau Twins
 Elizabeth Fraser – vocals, production
 Robin Guthrie – guitar, drum machine, production
 Will Heggie – bass guitar, production
with:
Cindy Sharp - backing vocals on "Dear Heart", "Hearsay Please" and "Hazel"
 Technical
 Ivo Watts-Russell – production
 Eric Radcliffe – engineering at Blackwing Studios
 John Fryer – engineering at Blackwing Studios
 23 Envelope – sleeve design, photography and art direction

References

External links 

 
 

1982 debut albums
Cocteau Twins albums
4AD albums
Post-punk albums by Scottish artists